The New York Central Railroad (NYC) called the 4-8-2 type of steam locomotive the Mohawk type. It was known as the Mountain type on other roads, but the New York Central didn't see the name as fitting on its famous Water Level Route. Instead, it picked the name of one of those rivers its rails followed, the Mohawk River, to name its newest type of locomotive. Despite the more common name, the 4-8-2 was actually suited in many ways more to flatland running than slow mountain slogging, with its 4-wheel leading truck for stability at speed.

Indeed, the New York Central became the largest user of this wheel arrangement in North America, with 600  locomotives of this type built for its service; only the Pennsylvania Railroad came anywhere close, with 301 M1's of the type.

The Mohawk type was the pre-eminent freight power of the System, displacing the Mikado (2-8-2) type from first-line service. While other roads obtained much more massive freight power, Decapods (2-10-0s), Texas (2-10-4) types and a multitude of articulated designs, the New York Central, with its practically-gradeless high-speed raceways along the rivers, needed speed, not lugging ability.

The 600 Mohawks delivered were divided into four main classes, plus a few experimental and prototypes that were rebuilt between 1922 and 1939.

L-1a, b, c, d 

The first Mohawks delivered for the NYC were delivered by ALCO in 1916; these were purely freighters, with 69-inch drivers and small tenders. Further orders of L-1 subclasses followed in subsequent years, including some from the Lima Locomotive Works. All these locomotives had uncluttered lines as built, mostly thanks to the lack of such modern appliances as feedwater heaters, booster engines and the like. Many had feedwater heaters and other appliances added later, however.  185 L-1 locomotives were produced. The L-1a's were numbered 2500–2529, the L-1b's were numbered 2530–2584, the L-1c's were numbered 2585-2639 and the L-1d's were numbered 2640–2684.

Experimental 3-cylindered
The New York Central had two L-1 locomotives, numbered 2518 and  2605, rebuilt by Alco in 1922 with three cylinders to help determine if three-cylinder drive was worthwhile. They were substantially more powerful than the two-cylinder locomotives, but it was debatable if the additional maintenance requirements of a third, central cylinder, valve gear, main rod and crank axle were worthwhile. In 1924, locomotive 2569 was rebuilt by Alco as a Class L-1b-3 Cylinder. The NYC must have come down on the negative side of that question, for no more were built.

L-2a, b, c, d

The next development of the Mohawk type for the New York Central was the L-2, 300 of its various subclasses being built between 1925 and 1930 by the American Locomotive Company. These were rather more modern locomotives than the L-1 class: fat-boilered, long-tendered, fitted with feedwater heaters (mostly of the Elesco type and generally mounted in front of the smokebox at the top, giving an aggressive, beetle-browed look). Later L-2 subclasses, the L-2b and L-2c, had somewhat-smoother lines with recessed feedwater heaters and cleaned-up lines. The later L-2 locomotives, from a front-on view, appeared quite similar to the Central's fleet of Hudson passenger locomotives. The L2a's were numbered 2700–2799, the L2b's were numbered 2900–2924, the L2c's were numbered 2800-2899 and the L2d's were numbered 2925-2949 and 2950–2999. Locomotives 2995 and 2998 were modified for high-speed service in 1939.

L-3a, b, c

The next development of the Mohawk type was that of the dual-service locomotive, capable of working passenger as well as freight trains. Passenger service required the ability to work at 80 mph, as opposed to the 60 mph required of freight. The NYC's fleet of  Hudsons, 275 strong though it was, was proving inadequate to handle peak traffic demands, and some dual-purpose power would fix the problem nicely as well as giving the ability to handle express freight and mail services.

Two L-2 locomotives were given modifications for dual service work:  higher boiler pressure, smaller cylinders, lightweight reciprocating parts, dynamic counterbalancing of the drivers, roller bearings on all axles and so forth. The success of these modifications prompted the construction of 65 units of the L-3 class in 1940, 35 of which were built for dual-service and the remaining 30 for freight-only; as a result, the first 35 were equipped with roller bearings on every axle while the remaining 30 had roller bearings on every axle except for the drivers. The Class L-3a's were numbered 3000–3034.  The Class L-3b's were numbered 3035–3049; the L-3c's 3050–3064.  All were built by American Locomotive Company. And all had oval NYC emblems under their smokebox engine number placards.

All L-3 locomotives were given axle-spacing that could accommodate 72" drivers, but only one was ever fitted with such. This locomotive, #3000, paved the way for the final class of Mohawks on the New York Central, the L-4. The other 64 engines received 69" drivers.

L-4a, b’s
50 L-4 locomotives were produced by the Lima Locomotive Works in 1942. None of them had booster engines, although they were built to accommodate them should they be ever needed to start heavy trains, but were never so modified. The L-4s were truly dual-purpose locomotives, with 72" drivers, and worked the heaviest freight and passenger trains during the war. The L-3 and L-4 classes had huge tenders riding on two six-wheel trucks that were almost as long as the locomotives hauling them, and were mostly coal space with a capacity of 43 tons of coal; water was taken en route using the tender scoop from track pans and thus the locomotives did not need to have a large on-board water capacity. Some L-4s had Scullin Disc drivers. The L4a's and L4b's were numbered 3100-3124 and 3125–3149, respectively, and all were equipped with roller bearings on every axle. All L-4a's bore the above-described NYC "passenger" logo plates underneath their front smokebox number plates.

Many L-4 locomotives were fitted with smoke deflectors after delivery in 1942.

Preservation
Only two Mohawks out of the original 600 built have been preserved. This makes them the only examples of large, modern New York Central steam power to survive after all of NYC's Hudsons and Niagaras, along with subsidiary companies P&LE’s and B&A’s Berkshires were scrapped. The first, #2933, is a 1929 ALCO-built L-2d and resides at the National Museum of Transportation, St. Louis, Missouri while the second, #3001, is a 1940 ALCO-built L-3a at the National New York Central Railroad Museum in Elkhart, Indiana and is the largest surviving NYC steam locomotive.

Tenders for two other Mohawks still exist as well. The tender from 2662, a class L-1d, is currently in use behind Western Maryland Scenic Railroad 734 (ex-Lake Superior and Ishpeming Railroad  2-8-0 34) in Cumberland, Maryland. The tender for L-3b 3042 was converted into a water tender and was used with Reading T-1 4-8-4 2101 during its 1976 tour with the American Freedom Train, as well as with the Chessie System Special. It was later damaged in a roundhouse fire in 1979. This water tender is now placed behind L3a 3001 at the National New York Central Railroad Museum in Elkhart, Indiana.

See also
PRR M1, The Pennsylvania Railroad's version of the Mohawks
4-8-2, a dual mode  "mountain" type steam locomotive

References

 
 
 
  Reprinted from an issue of Trains magazine some time between April 1954 and November 1958.

ALCO locomotives
Lima locomotives
4-8-2 locomotives
New York Central Railroad locomotives
Steam locomotives of the United States
Railway locomotives introduced in 1916
Standard gauge locomotives of the United States